The spined dwarf mantis (Ameles fasciipennis) is an extinct species of praying mantis that was endemic to Italy.

It has only been collected once, probably in 1871 in the Tolentino area, and has not been seen since, despite extensive entomological surveys of the region.

Conservation
The IUCN Red List has declared this species extinct.

References

Ameles
Endemic fauna of Italy
Mantodea of Europe

Insects described in 1963
Species known from a single specimen